The Eighties is a documentary miniseries which premiered on CNN on March 31, 2016. Produced by Tom Hanks and Gary Goetzman's studio Playtone, it serves as a follow-up to the predecessors The Sixties and The Seventies with a 7-part series chronicling events and popular culture of the United States during the 1980s. In May 2016, CNN greenlit an 8-part follow-up titled The Nineties, which premiered in 2017.

Episodes
The series encountered numerous interruptions during subsequent broadcasts due to CNN's coverage of news events including the death of Prince and the political campaign of Donald Trump, which caused some episodes to be shown out of order from the original plan.

Production
CNN announced the production of The Eighties on May 13, 2015, before the premiere of their preceding miniseries The Seventies on June 11.

References

External links

Television series set in the 1980s
2010s American documentary television series
2016 American television series debuts
2016 American television series endings
CNN original programming
Documentary television series about the Cold War
Television series about the history of the United States
Television series by Playtone